Susan Patron (born 1948) is an American author of children's books. In 2007, she won the Newbery Award for The Higher Power of Lucky. Her first children's book, Burgoo Stew, was published in 1990.  It was followed by three more picture books and the book Maybe Yes, Maybe No, Maybe Maybe, which won the 1993 Parent's Choice Award. Patron published a sequel to The Higher Power of Lucky called Lucky Breaks (Simon & Schuster, March, 2009), and then followed it up with the third and final book in Lucky's Hard Pan Trilogy, Lucky For Good (Simon & Schuster, August, 2011).

Patron was the Juvenile Materials Collection Development Manager at the Los Angeles Public Library until her retirement in March 2007. She was a Senior Librarian at the Los Angeles Public Library, where she began in 1972.

She reviews children's literature, has taught and lectured on the subject, and has served on boards and committees in the field including the Society of Children's Book Writers and Illustrators.

Patron lives with her husband, Rene, in Los Angeles and in a small cabin in the high desert of the Eastern Sierra of California.

References

 

1948 births
Living people
American librarians
American women librarians
Newbery Medal winners
Writers from Los Angeles
Date of birth missing (living people)
21st-century American novelists
20th-century American women writers
21st-century American women writers
20th-century American writers
American women novelists